Kendra Norman (born December 17, 1966) is an African-American writer of Christian fiction and non-fiction Christian literature. Her novels are known and widely applauded for their positive male lead characters and their combined romantic and suspenseful story lines.

Biography
Kendra Norman is a native of West Palm Beach, Florida, but spent most of her formative years in southern Georgia. She graduated from Brooks County High School in Quitman, Georgia.

Kendra and her husband, Michael Holmes, share a blended family of two daughters and one son. Her first husband, Jimmy (whose last name was also Holmes - no relation to Michael) died. She and Jimmy married at St. Paul African Methodist Episcopal Church in Valdosta, GA when Kendra was 21 and Jimmy was 20.  Shortly after their daughter Crystal was born, Jimmy was diagnosed with AIDS, possibly as the result of a blood transfusion.  He died on October 5, 1995, a few days before their 7th wedding anniversary, and in her grief, Kendra began to write.

She crafted her first piece of poetry as an elementary school student, but Kendra did not grow to recognize her gift as a creative writer until 1999 when she began keeping a journal during the lingering heartache of the death of her husband. Shortly thereafter, she wrote her first fictional manuscript, For Love & Grace, published in  2002.  She worked days, and in the evenings, she pursued higher education at Valdosta Technical College (Valdosta, Georgia), where she majored in Information Office Technology and graduated in 1997. There, she was inducted into the National Vocational Technical Honor Society.  She was given a computer as a college graduation gift. Her life took many twists and turns during the years following Jimmy's death. Most of her true life experience is captured in two of her nonfiction published works, I Shall Not Die and The Path From Pain to Purpose, both of which are highly acclaimed books. Kendra eventually found true love again, and she and her current husband, Michael married in 2014. In 2017, Kendra and Michael jointly wrote a 31-day relationship devotional entitled Cross-Fire. It was her twenty-second published work and her husband's first. The book has received rave reviews from readers. Kendra went on to receive a Doctor of Divinity degree from St. Thomas Christian University in (Jacksonville, Florida) in 2019.

Kendra has appeared in a number of televised programs, including featured appearances on Atlanta LIVE (WATC TV 57's flagship program) and on BET's Lift Every Voice, where she was interviewed by the show's creator and former host, Gerard Henry.

She is a member of the Iota Phi Lambda sorority, and both she and her husband are ordained ministers. Together, they serve as Co-pastors of Deliverance Revival Church in central Georgia.

Previously writing under the name of Kendra Norman-Bellamy, she began officially writing under the name of Kendra Norman in 2013.

Career
In addition to her own writing, Kendra is the founder and Creative Director of Royalty Publications LLC (formerly KNB Publications), an independent self-publishing house that produces the works of up-and-coming writers of Christian-based fiction, nonfiction, and poetry. She is also the visionary of The I.S.L.A.N.D. Movement, a motivational ministry whose name is an acronym for "I Shall Live And Not Die." Lastly, she is the creator and host of Royal Pen Network, a bi-weekly Internet radio show that showcases artists who use their gifts and talents to create motivational, inspirational, and/or educational materials.

She self-published her debut novel, For Love & Grace in 2002. The book was re-released in 2004 through BET Books.

Kendra gained national bestseller status when her third release, Crossing Jhordan's River (Moody Publishers/May 2005), peaked at #1 on Essence magazine's best sellers list for paperback fiction.

The majority of her works have been produced through three large book publishers: Moody Publishers (Lift Every Voice imprint), Kimani Press (New Spirit imprint), and Urban Books (Urban Christian imprint).

In 2020, Kendra became the first African American to hold the position of Managing Editor for Houston Home Journal newspaper in its 150-year history. In 2022, she stepped away from her corporate job and created her own faith-based newspaper, which is distributed nationally. The mission of The Royal Trumpet is to deliver inspiration, motivation, education and the good news of Jesus Christ to people across the world.

Bibliography
Her published works include:
For Love & Grace (Guardian Books, 2002 / re-released BET Books, 2004)
A Love So Strong (Moody Publishers, 2004)
Thicker Than Water anthology (BET Books, 2005)
Crossing Jhordan's River (Moody Publishers, 2005)
Because of Grace (BET Books, 2005)
The Midnight Clear anthology (KNB Publications, 2006)
Three Fifty-Seven A.M. (Urban Books, 2006)
One Prayer Away (Moody Publishers, 2006)
In Greene Pastures (Urban Books, 2006)
More Than Grace (BET Books, 2006)
This Far By Faith anthology (Kimani, 2008)
Battle of Jericho (Urban Books, 2008)
The Lyons Den (Urban Books, 2009)
The Morning After (Urban Books, 2010)
Fifteen Years (Moody Publishers, 2010)
Song of Solomon (Urban Books, 2010)
I Shall Not Die (KNB Publications, 2010 / re-released Royalty Publications, 2016) *non-fiction
Upon This Rock (Urban Books, 2011)
When Solomon Sings (Urban Books, 2012)
The Path From Pain to Purpose (Royalty Publications, 2014) *non-fiction
Blondeva's Boys (Royalty Publications, 2016)
Cross-Fire (Royalty Publications, 2017) *daily devotional

Awards
2004: Best BET Romance of the Year, Shades of Romance Magazine
2004: Best Multi-cultural Christian Fiction Author, Shades of Romance Magazine
2004: Best Multi-cultural Christian Romance, Shades of Romance Magazine
2005: Best Christian Author, Memphis Black Writer's Conference
2006: African American Literary Award for Best Christian Fiction
2007: African American Literary Award for Best Romance
2008: African American Literary Award for Best Anthology
2008: African American Literary Award for Best Christian Fiction
2009: Best Anthology of the Decade, EDC Creations
2013: Georgia Excellence Award (Royalty Publications), Small Business Institute for Excellence in Commerce
2014: Trailblazer Award, I Inspire To Write Author Explosion
2022: Heritage Award, Jubilee of Reading Book Club Conference

References

External links
Official Website
Publishing Website
Motivational Website

1966 births
Living people
21st-century American novelists
African-American novelists
American women novelists
Christian novelists
Novelists from Georgia (U.S. state)
People from Quitman, Georgia
21st-century American women writers
21st-century African-American women writers
21st-century African-American writers
20th-century African-American people
20th-century African-American women